Lalit Kumar Yadav is an Indian politician and a member of Bihar Legislative Assembly of India. He represents the Darbhanga Rural constituency in Darbhanga district of Bihar. He was elected in 2010 as a member of Rashtriya Janata Dal.

References

1966 births
Living people
Rashtriya Janata Dal politicians
Bihar MLAs 2015–2020
Bihar MLAs 2020–2025
People from Darbhanga district